Robert Graham Lowes (18 February 1902 – 1985) was an English footballer who played as a centre forward in the Football League for Darlington.

Lowes was born in High Spen, County Durham, the second child of George Lowes, a stone miner, and his wife Isabella. At the time of the 1911 Census, the family were living in Rowlands Gill. He began his football career with non-league club Lintz Colliery, and scored three goals from thirteen appearances in the Third Division North playing as a centre forward for Darlington in the 1928–29 Football League season.

He died in Gateshead in 1985.

Notes

References

1902 births
1985 deaths
People from High Spen
Footballers from Tyne and Wear
Footballers from County Durham
English footballers
Association football forwards
Darlington F.C. players
English Football League players